Pigossi is a Brazilian surname. Notable people with the surname include:

Laura Pigossi (born 1994), Brazilian professional tennis player
Marco Pigossi (born 1989), Brazilian actor and producer